An airport terminal is a building at an airport where passengers transfer between ground transportation and the facilities that allow them to board and disembark from an aircraft.

Within the terminal; passengers purchase tickets; transfer their luggage; go through security. The buildings that provide access to the airplanes (via gates) are typically called concourses. However, the terms "terminal" and "concourse" are sometimes used interchangeably, depending on the configuration of the airport.

Smaller airports have one terminal while larger airports have several terminals and/or concourses. At small airports, the single terminal building typically serves all of the functions of a terminal and a concourse.

Some larger airports have one terminal that is connected to multiple concourses via walkways, sky-bridges, or tunnels (such as Denver International Airport, modeled after Atlanta's, the world's busiest), or Orlando International Airport (modeled after Tampa's). Some larger airports have more than one terminal, each with one or more concourses (such as New York's John F. Kennedy International Airport, which has six, and London's Heathrow Airport and Chicago's O'Hare International Airport, which both have four). Still other larger airports have multiple terminals each of which incorporate the functions of a concourse (such as Dallas/Fort Worth International Airport or Philadelphia International Airport).

According to Frommers, "most airport terminals are built in a plain style, with the concrete boxes of the 1960s and 1970s generally gave way to glass boxes in the 1990s and 2000s, with the best terminals making a vague stab at incorporating ideas of "light" and "air"'. However, some, such as Baghdad International Airport and Denver International Airport, are monumental in stature, while others are considered architectural masterpieces, such as Terminal 1 at Charles de Gaulle Airport, near Paris, the main terminal at Washington Dulles in Virginia, or the TWA Flight Center at New York's JFK Airport. A few are designed to reflect the culture of a particular area, some examples being the terminal at Albuquerque International Sunport in New Mexico, which is designed in the Pueblo Revival style popularized by architect John Gaw Meem, as well as the terminal at Bahías de Huatulco International Airport in Huatulco, Oaxaca, Mexico, which features some palapas that are interconnected to form the airport terminal."

When London Stansted Airport's new terminal opened in 1991, it marked a shift in airport terminal design since Norman Foster placed the baggage handling system in the basement in order to create a vast open interior space. Airport architects have followed this model since unobstructed sightlines aid with passenger orientation. In some cases, architects design the terminal's ceiling and flooring with cues that suggest the required directional flow. For instance, at Toronto Pearson's Terminal 1 Moshe Safdie included skylights for wayfinding purposes.

History

In the early history of air flight, airlines checked in their passengers at downtown terminals, and had their own transportation facilities to the airfield. For example, Air France checked in passengers at the Invalides Air Terminal (Aérogare des Invalides) from 1946 to 1961, when all passengers started checking in at the airport. The Air Terminal continued in service as the boarding point for airline buses until 2016.

Chicago's O'Hare International Airport's innovative design pioneered concepts such as direct highway access to the airport, concourses, and jetbridges; these designs are now seen at most airports worldwide.

Designs

Due to the rapid rise in popularity of passenger flight, many early terminals were built in the 1930s–1940s and reflected the popular art deco style architecture of the time. One such surviving example from 1940 is the Houston Municipal Airport Terminal. Early airport terminals opened directly onto the tarmac: passengers would walk or take a bus to their aircraft. This design is still common among smaller airports, and even many larger airports have "bus gates" to accommodate aircraft beyond the main terminal.

Pier

A pier design uses a small, narrow building with aircraft parked on both sides. One end connects to a ticketing and baggage claim area. Piers offer high aircraft capacity and simplicity of design, but often result in a long distance from the check-in counter to the gate (up to half a mile in the cases of Kansai International Airport or Lisbon Portela Airport's Terminal 1). Most large international airports have piers.

Satellite terminals

A satellite terminal is a building detached from other airport buildings, so that aircraft can park around its entire circumference. The first airport to use a satellite terminal was London Gatwick Airport. It used an underground pedestrian tunnel to connect the satellite to the main terminal. This was also the first setup at Los Angeles International Airport, but it has since been converted to a pier layout. The first airport to use an automatic people mover to connect the main terminal with a satellite was Tampa International Airport, which is the standard today. The world's largest satellite terminal is Terminal S1 and S2 at Shanghai Pudong International Airport. The 622,000 square meter 90 gate terminal is connected to the main terminal by a high capacity people mover using conventional subway trains. Other examples include the following:
 Montreal's Pierre Elliott Trudeau International Airport has terminal section called Aeroquai connected by walkways and it's used mostly for short haul regional domestic flights and some International departures when there's no gates available.
 Paris's Charles de Gaulle Airport (Terminal 1), Geneva International Airport and London Gatwick Airport (South Terminal) have circular satellite terminals, connected by walkways.
 Lisbon Internacional Airport (Terminal 2) has a small rectangular satellite terminal, connect by a free shuttle service (accessible by Terminal 1, every 10 minutes).
 Orlando International Airport and Pittsburgh International Airport have multi-pier satellite terminals.
 Brussels Airport's Pier A is connected to the main building via tunnels and walkways.
 Zurich Airport's Midfield Terminal (Concourse E) is connected to the main terminal via an underground Skymetro.
 London Gatwick Airport's Pier 6 (North Terminal) connects to the main terminal via the world's longest over-taxiway bridge.
 At Logan International Airport in Boston, Terminal A has two sections of gates, one of which is a satellite terminal connected by an underground walkway.
 Denver International Airport, Cincinnati/Northern Kentucky International Airport, and Hartsfield-Jackson Atlanta International Airport have linear satellite terminals connected by central passages. This design originated with Atlanta and was selected for the Denver airport terminals when the new airport in Denver was built. The linear satellite terminals are connected by automatic people movers. Atlanta's is called the Plane Train. In the Atlanta and Cincinnati airports, underground moving walkways also connect the linear satellite terminals. At Denver there is an indoor bridge from the main terminal to the first satellite terminal, but there is no walkway to the remaining satellite terminals.
 Terminal 1 at O'Hare International Airport has two concourses: Concourse B is directly adjacent to the airport access road, while Concourse C is a satellite building connected by an underground walkway lit with a neon light show, and an airy and very slow-tempo version of United Airlines' theme music "Rhapsody in Blue".
 Terminal 8 at John F. Kennedy International Airport in New York has two concourses: one main concourse, and a satellite concourse connected to the main concourse by an underground walkway.
 London Stansted Airport has one main terminal building with three linear satellite terminals all connected to the main terminal by an automated people mover. The airport is currently expanding by adding another satellite building.
 Kuala Lumpur International Airport has a cross-shaped satellite terminal which is used for international flights.
 Cancun International Airport Terminal 2 is an irregular terminal with two concourses, Main building and Satellite building, the latter one being the satellite terminal.
 Seattle-Tacoma International Airport has two rectangular satellite terminals connected by automatic people movers.
 Jinnah International Airport in Karachi has one main terminal, divided into two concourses: the Jinnah East Satellite Concourse, used for international flights, and the Jinnah West Satellite Concourse, used for domestic and some international flights. Both satellite concourses are connected to the main terminals by pedestrian walkways.
 Harry Reid International Airport in Las Vegas has an X-shaped satellite terminal, named Concourse D, that is connected by two automatic people movers - one from Terminal 1 (which houses Concourses A, B, and C) and one from Terminal 3 (which houses Concourse E). In addition, despite being part of Terminal 1, Concourse C is connected to the rest of the terminal by an automatic people mover. Concourse D is connected to Terminal 3 by an underground walkway that is only used for international arrivals.
 Mariano Escobedo International Airport is the first and only airport in Mexico which has a completely satellite terminal. Terminal A is connected from the main building to the satellite building via tunnels.
 Terminal 5 at London Heathrow Airport has two satellite terminals, 5B, and 5C, connected via an underground people mover.
 Rome Fiumicino Airport has one satellite terminal, called T3G, connected by a Bombardier Innovia APM 100.
 Madrid–Barajas Airport has one linear satellite terminal, named T4S, which is connected to the Terminal 4 main building by an automated people mover.
 Both midfield terminals at Washington Dulles International Airport use this design, with Concourses A, B, and C being connected to the main terminal by the AeroTrain, and Concourse D via a mobile lounge service. There is also an underground walkway from the main terminal to Concourse B.
 Munich Airport has one satellite terminal, named Satellite Terminal 2 (commonly known as "der Satellit" in German), which is connected to the Terminal 2 by an underground automated people mover.
 Terminal E at Dallas/Fort Worth International Airport has a small satellite concourse, accessed by an underground pedestrian walkway. The Terminal E Satellite currently has 9 gates, but in April 2018, it was announced by DFW Airport and American Airlines that the 9 mainline gates would be converted into 15 regional gates, along with updating interior fixtures such as carpet, elevators, escalators and moving walkways. American plans to have renovations completed and be fully moved into the terminal in Spring 2019. Terminal B also has a satellite concourse, albeit with ten mainline gates.
 Suvarnabhumi Airport in Bangkok, Thailand has a satellite terminal in its Phase II extension which is currently under construction and it is due for completion by 2022.
 Chennai International Airport started construction of satellite terminal which is slated for completion by 2022.

Semicircular terminals 

Some airports use a semicircular terminal, with aircraft parked on one side and cars on the other. This design results in long walks for connecting passengers, but greatly reduces travel times between check-in and the aircraft. Airports designed around this model include Charles de Gaulle Airport (terminal 2), Chhatrapati Shivaji International Airport, Mumbai (old terminal 2), Dallas/Fort Worth International Airport, Seoul's Incheon International Airport, Jakarta's Soekarno-Hatta International Airport (terminal 1 & 2), Toronto Pearson Airport, Kansas City Airport, Nairobi's Jomo Kenyatta International Airport, Rio de Janeiro–Galeão International Airport and Sapporo's New Chitose Airport.

Other
A particularly unusual design was employed at Berlin Tegel Airport's Terminal A. Consisting of an hexagonal-shaped ring around a courtyard, five of the outer walls were airside and fitted with jet bridges, while the sixth (forming the entrance), along with the inner courtyard, was landside. Although superficially resembling a satellite design insofar as aircraft could park around most of the structure, it was in fact a self-contained terminal which unlike a satellite did not depend on remote buildings for facilities such as check-in, security controls, arrivals etc.

Especially unique were its exceptionally short walking distances and lack of any central area for security, passport control, arrivals or transfer. Instead, individual check-in counters are located immediately in front of the gate of the flight they serve. Checked-in passengers then entered airside via a short passage situated immediately to the side of the check-in desk, passed (for non-Schengen flights) a single passport control booth (with officers sat in the same area as check-in staff), followed by a single security lane which terminated at the gate's waiting area behind. Pairs of gates shared the same seating area, with small kiosks for duty-free and refreshments making up the only airside commercial offerings. Thus, other than the adjacent gate, passengers could not move around the terminal airside and there was no central waiting lounge and retail area for departures. Individual rooms for arrivals, likewise serving a pair of gates, each contained a single baggage carousel and were alternately situated in between each pair of departure gates on the same level, such that the entrance/exit of each jet bridge lied at the boundary of the two areas. Two or three passport control booths were located close to the end of the jet bridge for arriving passengers (causing passengers to queue into the bridge and plane itself) and passengers left the arrivals area unsegregated from departing passengers into the same landside ring-concourse, emerging next to the check-in desks. This allowed both arriving and departing passengers immediate access to the courtyard on the same level, where short-stay parking and taxi-pickup were located. Vehicles could enter and exit via a road underpass underneath the terminal building entrance.

For flights using jet-bridges and passengers arriving or leaving by private transport, this resulted in extremely short walking distances of just a few tens of metres between vehicles and the plane, with only a slightly longer walk for public transport connections. A downside of this design is a lack of any provision for transfer flights, with passengers only able to transit landside.

Another rarer terminal design is the mobile lounge, where passengers are transported from the gate to their aircraft in a large vehicle which docks directly to the terminal and the aircraft. Washington Dulles International Airport, Mexico City International Airport, and Mirabel International Airport have used this design.

Hybrid layouts also exist. San Francisco International Airport and Melbourne Airport use a hybrid pier-semicircular layout and a pier layout for the rest.

Common-use facility
A common-use facility or terminal design disallows airlines to have its own proprietary check-in counters, gates and IT systems. Rather, check-in counters and gates can be flexibly reassigned as needed. This is used at Boston Logan International Airport's Terminal E.

Records
This table below lists the top airport terminals throughout the world with the largest amount of floor area, with usable floor space across multiple stories of at least .

Ground transportation
Many small and mid-size airports have a single, two, or three-lane one-way loop road which is used by local private vehicles and buses to drop off and pick up passengers.

An international airport may have two grade-separated one-way loop roads, one for departures and one for arrivals. It may have a direct rail connection by regional rail, light rail, or subway to the downtown or central business district of the closest major city. The largest airports may have direct connections to the closest freeway. The Hong Kong International Airport has ferry piers on the airside for ferry connections to and from mainland China and Macau without passing through Hong Kong immigration controls.

Zones
Pre-Security (landside)
 Check-in counters
 Retail stores and restaurants
 Baggage claim

Post Security (airside)
 Duty-free shops
 Retail stores and restaurants
 Airport lounges
 Airport customs

See also

 Airport rail link
 Environmental impact of aviation
 International zone

References

External links

 

pt:Aeródromo#Conceitos